The Río Negro (Black River) is a river in southern Brazil and central Uruguay. It originates in the southern highlands of Brazil, just east of Bagé, and flows west across the entire width of Uruguay to the Uruguay River. The course of the Río Negro across Uruguay effectively divides the south of the country from the north. The Río Negro's principal tributaries are Yí River and Tacuarembó River.

The river is dammed near Paso de los Toros, creating the Rincón del Bonete Reservoir, also called the Gabriel Terra Reservoir or the Rio Negro Reservoir.

Downstream from the Rincón del Bonete Reservoir, there are two more dams, the Baygorria Dam and the Constitución Dam at Palmar, which generate hydroelectric power for Uruguay with 108 MW and 333 MW, respectively.

There is a delta at its confluence with the Uruguay River with two main mouths. Yaguarí creek -bordered by Vizcaino and Lobos Islands- is the navigable entry to Negro River, and may change water flow direction when the Uruguay is high while the southern mouth (Spanish: Boca Falsa) is very wide but shallow.

See also
Lago Rincón del Bonete
1959 flood in Uruguay

References

External links
 

Rivers of Uruguay
Rivers of Brazil
Tributaries of the Uruguay River
Rivers of Rio Grande do Sul
Rivers of Cerro Largo Department
Rivers of Rivera Department
Rivers of Tacuarembó Department
Rivers of Durazno Department
Rivers of Río Negro Department
Rivers of Flores Department
Rivers of Soriano Department